Ready may refer to:

Film and television 
 Ready, a 2002 British short starring Imelda Staunton
 Ready (2008 film), a Telugu film
 Ready (2011 film), a Hindi remake of the Telugu film
 "Ready" (New Girl), a television episode

Music 
 Ready Records, a Canadian record label

Albums 
 Ready! (Nami Tamaki album), 2011
 Ready (Sandy Lam album), 1988
 Ready (Trey Songz album), 2009
 Ready, by Reni Lane, 2010

EPs 
 Ready (Ella Mai EP), 2017
 Ready (Victon EP), 2017
 Ready (Ruel EP), 2018

Songs 
 "Ready" (Alessia Cara song), 2019
 "Ready" (B.o.B song), 2013
 "Ready" (Fabolous song), 2013
 "Ready" (Kodaline song), 2015
 "Ready?", by Tomoko Kawase, 2005
 "Ready", by Black Rob from The Black Rob Report, 2005
 "Ready", by Cat Stevens from Buddha and the Chocolate Box, 1974
 "Ready", by Cherie from the Confessions of a Teenage Drama Queen soundtrack album, 2004
 "Ready", by Kelly Clarkson from All I Ever Wanted, 2009
 "Ready", by Kovas, 2010
 "Ready", by Montaigne from Complex, 2019
 "Ready", by N-Toon from Toon Time, 2000
 "Ready", a gospel song with music by Charles Davis Tillman, 1903

Other uses 
 Ready (surname), persons with the surname Ready
 Ready, Kentucky, a community in the United States
 Ready PAC, a 2013–2015 U.S. super PAC supporting Hillary Clinton
 HMS Ready (J223), a World War I minesweeper
 IF Ready, a Norwegian sports club

See also

Reddy (disambiguation)